Dolichophonus is an extinct genus of scorpions known from the Silurian-age Gutterford Burn Eurypterid bed, in the Pentland Hills in Scotland.  It is currently considered the world's oldest known scorpion, as the older Parioscorpio named in 2020 has been found to be an unrelated arthropod. lt is sometimes referred to Palaeophonus.

Discovery
The specimen of Dolichophonus was collected by Mr Hardie of Bavelaw Castle. When he died, his collection was given to the Edinburgh Museum of Science and Art (now National Museum of Scotland), where it was then studied by Malcolm Laurie. He named seven new species of eurypterids from the collection, along with this scorpion, which he named.

References

Prehistoric scorpions